Working is an American sitcom television series that aired on NBC for two seasons from October 8, 1997 to January 25, 1999. The series was created and executive produced by Michael Davidoff and Bill Rosenthal. The series stars Fred Savage and an ensemble cast including Maurice Godin, Arden Myrin, Yvette Freeman, and Steve Hytner.

Synopsis
Working took a satirical (and sometimes over-the-top) look at office life within a big corporate company. The show starred Fred Savage as the naive Matt Peyser who had just graduated from college and was ready to climb the corporate ladder. His ideals are constantly challenged by his boss, Tim Deale, played by Maurice Godin. Other characters included dim-witted Jimmy (Dana Gould), under-appreciated secretary Hal (Sarah Knowlton), overly perky Abby Cosgrove (Arden Myrin), acerbic Delaney (Steve Hytner), and no-nonsense manager Evelyn (Yvette Freeman), that Matt makes friends and work with.

Due to faltering ratings, the network attempted to breathe new life into the show during the second season with some cast changes. This included writing out the characters of Jimmy and Hal. They were replaced by Debi Mazar as the ruthless Liz and Rebecca McFarland as Val (As an in-joke, when Matt first sees Liz and Val he mistakenly calls them Jimmy and Hal). During the series run, Danica McKellar, formerly Savage's costar in The Wonder Years,  made two guest-appearances playing a woman Savage's character meets in a bar, and of whom he says "she reminds me of a girl I grew up with!"
   
Ratings for the series didn't improve, however, and NBC canceled Working in January 1999. 35 of the 39 episodes produced were aired.

Theme song
The show used a sound-alike version of Devo's cover of the song "Working in the Coal Mine", set over top of scenes of work, including marching workers from the film Metropolis, frantic work scenes from Terry Gilliam's Brazil and office scenes from Billy Wilder's The Apartment.  The vocals of the theme song were removed for the USA Network broadcasts.

Cast and characters
 Fred Savage as Matt Peyser
 Maurice Godin as Tim Deale
 Yvette Freeman as Evelyn Smalley
 Sarah Knowlton as Hal Blum (season 1)
 Arden Myrin as Abby Cosgrove
 Todd Waring (pilot only) and Steve Hytner as John Delaney
 Joey Slotnick (pilot only) and Dana Gould as Jimmy Clarke (season 1)
 Kate Hodge as Chris Grant (10 episodes, season 1)
 Rebecca McFarland as Val Gibson (season 2)
 Debi Mazar as Liz Tricoli (season 2)

Episodes

Series overview

Season 1 (1997–98)

Season 2 (1998–99)

Awards

Notes

References

External links
 
 

1997 American television series debuts
1999 American television series endings
1990s American sitcoms
1990s American workplace comedy television series
English-language television shows
NBC original programming
Television series by Universal Television